= Nkemakonam =

- Gender: unisex
- Language: Igbo

Origin
- Meaning: 'may what is mine never leave me'
- Region of origin: Igboland

Nkemakonam is an Igbo unisex given name. It means 'may what is mine never leave me' or 'may I not lose my own.' The name reflects gratitude, protection, and value for one's blessings.
